Grégori Derangère (born 27 March 1971) is a French actor.

Career 

Derangère was born in Montpellier where his parents finished their medicine studies. He moved to Moscow and French Guiana during his childhood and then to Paris.
	 
He studied acting at the Cours Florent when he was 21 years old in Paris and at École nationale supérieure des arts et techniques du théâtre in Lyon. At 25, he acted in his first film, Éric Rochant's Anna Oz, with Charlotte Gainsbourg and Gérard Lanvin.
 	
In 1999, he played his first major role in 30 ans by Laurent Perrin with Arielle Dombasle, Julie Depardieu, Laurent Lucas and Anne Brochet.
	 
In 2002, he was nominated for a César Award for Most Promising Actor for playing a soldier in François Dupeyron's The Officers' Ward with Sabine Azéma, Éric Caravaca and André Dussollier.
	 
In 2004, he won the César Award for Most Promising Actor for his performance as Frédéric Auger in Jean-Paul Rappeneau's Bon Voyage.

Gregori is one of the ambassadors of Nicolas Hulot's foundation.

Filmography

Film

Television

References

External links 
 

1971 births
Living people
Actors from Montpellier
French male film actors
French male television actors
Cours Florent alumni
Most Promising Actor Lumières Award winners
Most Promising Actor César Award winners
20th-century French male actors
21st-century French male actors